No. 516 Squadron RAF was an army co-operation squadron of the Royal Air Force during the Second World War.

History
No. 516 Squadron was formed on 28 April 1943 at RAF Dundonald from 1441 (Combined Operations) Flight on 28 April 1943. Its role was to provide realistic training facilities to the Combined Operations Training Centre and other training units in the Western Scotland area. It operated a large variety of aircraft with the unusual task to provide realistic low-level attacks against commando and assault troops undergoing training. The work involved detaching aircraft near the troop training areas including RAF Ayr and RAF Haverfordwest. By 1944 the training of commando and assault troops was on the decline and the squadron was disbanded at Dundonald on 2 December 1944.

No squadron codes are known to have been carried between April 1943 and Dec 1944.

Aircraft operated

See also
List of Royal Air Force aircraft squadrons

References

Citations

Bibliography

. Shears was a pilot with 516 and the book includes a chapter on his experiences with them.

External links
 Squadron histories for nos. 500–520 sqn
 Squadron history on MOD site
 Site for no. 516 Combined Operations Sqn

516
Aircraft squadrons of the Royal Air Force in World War II
Military units and formations established in 1943
Military units and formations disestablished in 1944